Framboise (Framboise, French for "Raspberry") is a small community in the Canadian province of Nova Scotia, located in Richmond County.
It lies to the southwest of the Framboise River.

References

Framboise on Destination Nova Scotia

Communities in Richmond County, Nova Scotia
General Service Areas in Nova Scotia